Anderson Manor may refer to:

 Anderson Manor, Dorset, a 1622, Grade I listed, manor house in Dorset, England
 Anderson Manor, Pennsylvania, an 1830, historic house in Pennsylvania, US

See also
Anderson House (disambiguation)